The "DK Rap" is the introduction theme to the 1999 Nintendo 64 video game Donkey Kong 64. Originally conceived by Rare designer George Andreas and composed by Grant Kirkhope, Andreas co-wrote and performed the lyrics, with Rare staffers joining in the chorus. Its lyrics describe the five playable characters in the video game, with Kirkhope's goal was to concept juxtapose old Donkey Kong versus new Donkey Kong found in Donkey Kong Country.

The DK Rap is the first song in the 1999 Donkey Kong 64 Original Soundtrack where it was named "Da Banana Bunch". Despite Grant Kirkhope not intending to make a serious rap, the "DK Rap" has received generally mixed reception and has been awarded "dubious awards" for its quality. The song has since been remixed in other Nintendo games and can be downloaded on their website.

Concept and history

The "DK Rap" is the introductory theme to the Nintendo 64 video game Donkey Kong 64; its lyrics describe the five playable characters in the video game - Donkey Kong, Diddy Kong, Tiny Kong, Lanky Kong, and Chunky Kong. The rap was originally conceived by Donkey Kong 64 designer George Andreas and composed by Grant Kirkhope. Andreas took inspiration from the band Run DMC. Kirkhope's goal was to do a similar concept to the concept of juxtaposing old Donkey Kong versus new Donkey Kong found in Donkey Kong Country. Andreas wrote and performed the lyrics (alongside Donkey Kong 64 lead programmer Chris Sutherland) to the song while Kirkhope wrote the tune. The chorus included Rare staffers such as Gregg Mayles, Steve Mayles, Ed Bryan, and Chris Peil. Each character's verse featured instrumentals which reflected the actual instruments that the different characters possessed. Kirkhope stated that it was not supposed to be a "serious rap" but rather a joke. Consumer and critical reaction, however, was generally negative and felt that the song was serious. Kirkhope felt surprised that Nintendo objected to the use of the word "hell" and attributed it to the Bible belt in the United States. The Japanese version of the "DK Rap" was not localized for the Japanese release of Donkey Kong 64, nor was it subtitled. Video game designer Shigesato Itoi provided a Japanese translation of the "DK Rap" on his personal website.

The "DK Rap" was remixed in Super Smash Bros. Melee. Composer Hirokazu Ando was originally going to be in charge of composition of the song, but due to technical issues, director Masahiro Sakurai and composer Shogo Sakai had to assist. To overcome these issues, they played the background audio and recorded the rap over it. Because the remixed rap is faster, it was not possible for them to record it live. Some characters in the theme have higher tempos than others. While the DJ (James W. Norwood Jr.) practiced, they recorded him, using what good came out of it and mixing it together. The rap took two days to record.

Legacy
The DK Rap is the first song in the 1999 Donkey Kong 64 Original Soundtrack where it was named "Da Banana Bunch". Around the release of Donkey Kong 64, Nintendo of America hosted a promotion called the "DK Rap Attack Contest" where people could submit a recording of themselves singing their own version of the "DK Rap". The winner would receive a Donkey Kong 64/Nintendo 64 console bundle, a trip to Nintendo of America's headquarters in Redmond, Washington, and their video would be hosted on the official Donkey Kong 64 website. The song was made available for download on Nintendo's website for use with this promotion.

A new version of the DK Rap was featured in the 2001 GameCube Nintendo crossover fighting game Super Smash Bros. Melee, performed by James W. Norwood Jr. who provided different voices for every verse. The original theme features the word "hell", which was changed to "heck" for the Melee release. This version was later reused in its sequels Super Smash Bros. Brawl, Super Smash Bros. for Wii U, and Super Smash Bros. Ultimate, and was featured as a song in the GameCube music game Donkey Konga. It was also released on the album Donkey Konga: The Hottest Hits. In English-language versions of Super Smash Bros. for 3DS/Wii U and Super Smash Bros. Ultimate, Donkey Kong's crowd cheer is a variant of the DK Rap. As part of a Kickstarter stretch goal, Grant Kirkhope wrote a spiritual successor to the DK Rap, titled the "Yooka-Laylee Rap", for Yooka-Laylee.

Reception

Since its appearance in Donkey Kong 64, the "DK Rap" has received generally mixed reception. It was awarded "dubious awards" for its quality. It also received criticism for its use of the word "hell" despite its ESRB rating. 1Up.com's Scott Sharkey included it in his list of the "top 5 cringe-inducing videogame raps" and claimed that it was a "100% reliable method of emptying the place" in which he took his cigarette breaks. He also called it one of the worst video game themes and called it "so-bad-it's-good" due to its "fundamental cluelessness". He stated, "Really, when I think of the improvisational musical art of the inner city underclasses the first thing that comes to mind is a tie-wearing Japanese gorilla. Yeah." Destructoid's Dale North included it in his list of the most obnoxious video game songs and joked that he imagined the Fresh Prince of Bel Air character Carlton Banks dancing to it. The song was performed on a pop show in Japan by a high-profile Japanese rapper. Composer Grant Kirkhope compared the theme's recent resurgence to popularity to the band ABBA and expressed joy that more people consider the song funny. Video Game Music Online criticized the Donkey Konga album remix due to its new vocalist and attempt to introduce authentic rap elements.

NGamer UK included it in their article about the "evil side of kiddy gaming" and called it "so-bad-it'll-make-your-ears-bleed rotten". The DK Rap was included in IGN's list of the worst in-game quotes at number eight. The staff claimed that the song "comes to mind" when they think of video game's "all-time terrible moments". They stated that it was the "only song in history that sounds like vomit". Game Informers O'Dell Harmon included it at #2 in his list of the "freshest rap songs in video games". GamesRadar's Bob Mackey claimed that the "DK Rap" was the biggest addition to the Donkey Kong character in Donkey Kong 64. Composer Grant Kirkhope stated that staff of Big Huge Games (the company at which he was employed at the time) made fun of him for the song and added that his tombstone will read, "here lies the body of Grant Kirkhope, he wrote the DK Rap, may God have mercy on his soul". The line "His coconut gun can fire in spurts. If he shoots ya, it's gonna hurt!" was named the fourth worst game line ever in the January 2002 issue of Electronic Gaming Monthly. OC Weeklys Peter Mai included the song in his list of the "Top 5 Cheesiest (Yet Somehow Awesome) Video Game Songs". He stated, "[it is] probably the worst rap song ever written, but you know you still love it."

References

1999 songs
Donkey Kong
Nintendo 64
Nintendo music
Video game theme songs
Songs written for video games
Video game memes
Internet memes